IPC Section 300 is a 2009 Indian Kannada-language film directed by Shashikanth, starring Devaraj , Vijay Raghavendra , Priyanka, Suman Ranganath and Srujan Lokesh in lead roles.

Cast

Devaraj as Mallikarjun a.k.a. Mallik
Vijay Raghavendra as Vijay
Priyanka
Suman Ranganath as Mallik's wife
Srujan Lokesh as a police officer

Music

Reception

Critical response 

B. S. S. of Deccan Herald wrote "Yatiraj as Investigating Officer Vineet are efficient in their small roles. Heroine Priyanka is prescribed a dose of comedies to treat the depression on her face. The climax is riveting as expected and indeed lifts the film. The film scores in avoiding the ‘necessity’ to bow to ‘commercial, audience tastes’". Bangalore Mirror wrote Shankar Nag. Vijay Raghavendra looks odd in some scenes due to his weight loss, but otherwise is a bundle of energy. Srujan and Yethiraj fill their roles with life. The background score is superb. If only better ‘commercial’ sense had prevailed, this film would have been a class apart". R G Vijayasarathy of Rediff.com scored the film at 3 out of 5 stars and says "The screenplay and dialogues by Shashikanth are very realistic. The film as a whole belongs to Shashikanth who has to be appreciated for the choice of the subject and for exercising total control over his narration". Sify wrote "Srujan Lokesh is apt. The background score of MN Krupakar is well measured. The cinematography by Niranjan Babu has used the lighting effectively". The Times of India scored the film at 3 out of 5 stars and wrote "Devaraj gives an extraordinary performance. Vijaya Raghavendra is equally good. Suman Ranganath and Srujan are superb. Yathiraj shines. Camerawork by Niranjan Babu is good as is Veera Samarth's music".

References

2000s Kannada-language films
2009 films